The Carrs Park is a park in Wilmslow, Cheshire, England. The park was gifted to the town by Henry Boddington and follows the path of the River Bollin.

History
The word 'Carrs' comes from the Old Norse word 'Kjarr' meaning 'meadow recovered from bog' and indicates the original state and subsequent use of the area.  Most of the land upon which the park lies was owned by Lord Stamford and part of the Pownall Hall estate until being sold during the period 1841 to 1859. In 1800 a cotton mill was built on the site using the River Bollin for power, by 1828 it was being used to spin and weave silk and in 1903 it was being used as a laundry, it burned down in 1928 and little remains of the building. The park began to take shape in 1925 when Henry Boddington who created Boddingtons Brewery and resident at Pownall Hall gave playing fields to the public, this is commemorated on a stone arch at Chancel Lane. In 1935 Wilmslow Urban District Council bought the land adjacent and established The Carrs Park. The park follows the River Bollin which meanders to Quarry Bank Mill and then to Styal Country Park. Quarry Bank was originally a working mill that took power from the River Bollin and is now owned by the National Trust and a tourist attraction.

Facilities
There is a children's play area, multi-use football area, basketball, skateboard ramp, riverside and woodland walks, open grassland and picnicking. Wilmslow Parkrun takes place in the park, as does the Wilmslow Junior Parkrun. The area covered is 28.7 hectares (71 acres).

See also

List of parks and open spaces in Cheshire

References

Parks and open spaces in Cheshire
Urban public parks
Wilmslow